Paolo Ghiglione (born 2 February 1997) is an Italian professional footballer who plays as winger for  club Cremonese.

Club career

Early career
Born in 1997, Ghiglione started his football career with Derthona, playing for their youth teams until 2007. In August 2007, he had moved to A.C. Milan Primavera and he was loaned to A.C. Pavia for six months from January to June 2012. In August 2012, he finally transferred to Genoa C.F.C. Primavera.

Genoa
In 2015, Ghiglione was called up to the Genoa first team. He had ridden the pine in the several games from 2015 to 2016, but he did not play any games for the first team.

SPAL (loan)
On 1 July 2016, SPAL announced that Ghiglione was loaned to SPAL until the end of 2016/17 Season. On 5 November 2016, he made professional league debut against Novara at Stadio Silvio Piola in the Serie B, playing the game as a starter during 71 minutes.

Cremonese
On 17 July 2022, Ghiglione signed with Cremonese.

International career
On 10 October 2015, Ghiglione was first called up and played for Italy U19s against Macedonia U17s.
With the Under-19 side, he took part at the 2016 UEFA European Under-19 Championship, playing five games in the tournament, as Italy finished the competition as runners-up.

Career statistics

Club

References

Living people
1997 births
People from Voghera
Footballers from Lombardy
Association football midfielders
Italian footballers
Italy youth international footballers
Genoa C.F.C. players
S.P.A.L. players
F.C. Pro Vercelli 1892 players
Frosinone Calcio players
U.S. Cremonese players
Serie A players
Serie B players
Sportspeople from the Province of Pavia